Le Bal can refer to:

 Le Bal, a 1929 ballet by Vittorio Rieti
 Le Bal (novella), a 1931 French novella by Irène Némirovsky
 Le Bal (1931 film), a 1931 French film based on the novella
 Le Bal (1983 film), a 1983 Algerian film
 Le Bal (arts centre), a gallery, publisher, café and bookshop in Paris
 Le Bal des Débutantes, a Parisian fashion event

See also
 "Un Bal", the second movement of Symphonie fantastique by Hector Berlioz